Sir Hugh Williams, 8th Baronet (c. 1718–1794), was a British soldier and politician who sat in the House of Commons between 1768 and 1794.

Williams was the son of Col. Griffith Williams of Arianws, near Llangelynin, Caernarvonshire and his wife Mary Williams and was born in 1718.

He entered the army in 1739 and was captain in the 34th Foot in 1744. He succeeded to the baronetcy on the death of his cousin Sir Robert Williams, 7th Baronet in November 1745. In 1756 he was a major in the 6th Foot and was at Menorca when the garrison was attacked in that year. In  1759 he was in a volunteer battalion in the 85th Foot.
 
Williams married Emma, the dowager Viscountess Bulkeley, widow of James Bulkeley, 6th Viscount Bulkeley on 28 June 1760. She was daughter of Thomas Rowlands of Caerau, Anglesey, but as her father disapproved of Williams, the marriage was kept secret. Correspondence indicates that Williams was becoming involved in politics in Beaumaris, partly in the interest of his stepson Thomas Bulkeley, but was handicapped by the secrecy of his marriage. In the course of these dealings he became Lt Colonel in the 53rd Foot in 1761 and became Constable of Beaumaris castle in July 1761. However his regiment was stationed in Gibraltar and he was ordered to return to military duties on the European continent. Williams disliked the climate and wished to be transferred to a regiment at home. As this was refused he retired from the army on half-pay in December 1764 to take care of affairs at Beaumaris.

In 1768 he was elected Member of Parliament for Beaumaris but made little contribution.  His stepson Thomas Bulkeley joined him in parliament in 1774 and was encouraging him to take a greater interest. However he found parliamentary business tiresome and stood down in 1780.

He returned as MP for Beaumaris in a by-election in 1785 and retained the seat until his death on 19 August 1794.

Williams had  two sons and two daughters and was succeeded by his son  Robert.

References

Sources
Kidd, Charles, Williamson, David (editors). Debrett's Peerage and Baronetage (1990 edition). New York: St Martin's Press, 1990.

|-

1716 births
1794 deaths
British MPs 1768–1774
British MPs 1774–1780
British MPs 1784–1790
Members of the Parliament of Great Britain for Beaumaris
Baronets in the Baronetage of England